The Gnevyshev–Ohl rule (GO) is an empirical rule according to which the sum of Wolf’s sunspot numbers over an odd cycle exceeds that of the preceding even cycle—see the Figure. The rule breaks down under certain conditions. In particular, it invertes the sign across the Dalton minimum, but can be restored with the "lost cycle" in the end of the 18th century. The nature of the GO rule is still unclear.

References

Solar phenomena